Hart im Zillertal is a municipality in the Schwaz district in the Austrian state of Tyrol.

Geography
Hart lies across from Fügen on the east side of the Ziller.

References

Cities and towns in Schwaz District